The Mingjiang Bridge, also known as the Qingzhou Bridge, is a cable-stayed bridge over the Min River in Fuzhou, Fujian, China. The bridge is main span is  placing it among the largest cable-stayed bridges in the world, the span arrangement is 250+605+250 m. The bridge carries six lanes of traffic on the G15 Shenyang–Haikou Expressway and the S1531 Airport Expressway.

See also
List of largest cable-stayed bridges

References

Bridges in Fujian
Bridges completed in 2001
Cable-stayed bridges in China
Buildings and structures in Fuzhou
Toll bridges in China